= Browning, King & Co. =

Browning, King & Co. (later named Browning Fifth Avenue) was an American men's clothing manufacturing and retail company. It was founded by John Hazard Browning and William Charles Browning in 1822.
